Pracell is a surname. Notable people with the surname include:

Ben Parcell, English singer songwriter
C. E. Parcell (1800s–1900s), American architect1972
Gary Parcell (born 1933), Australian rugby league footballer
Kenneth Parcell, a character in the NBC sitcom 30 Rock
M. I. Parcell (1854–1916), American politician
Malcolm Parcell (1896–1987), American artist
Matt Parcell (born 1992), Australian rugby league footballer

See also
Parcel (disambiguation)
Parcells (disambiguation)